Amastus modesta is a moth in the family Erebidae. It was described by Peter Maassen in 1890. It is found in Bolivia.

References

Moths described in 1890
Spilosomina
Moths of South America